Richard Neville may refer to:

Richard Neville, 16th Earl of Warwick (1428–1471), "Warwick the Kingmaker", English noble, fought in the Wars of the Roses
Richard Neville, 5th Earl of Salisbury (1400–1460), Yorkist leader during the Wars of the Roses, father of the 16th Earl of Warwick
Richard Neville, 2nd Baron Latimer (died 1530), English soldier and peer
Richard Neville (soldier) (1615–1676), Commander at the Battle of Newbury
Richard Neville (the younger) (1655–1717), Member of Parliament for Berkshire
Richard Neville Aldworth Neville (1717–1793), English paladin and knight
Richard Griffin, 2nd Baron Braybrooke (1750–1825), aka Richard Aldworth Neville
Richard Griffin, 3rd Baron Braybrooke (1783–1858), aka Richard Neville
Richard Neville, 4th Baron Braybrooke (1820–1861), British archaeologist
Richard Neville, 8th Baron Braybrooke (1918–1943), Baron Braybrooke
Richard Neville (writer) (1941–2016), Australian writer, editor, futurist and journalist, editor of Oz magazine in the 1960s
Ritchie Neville (born 1979), British boy band singer